This is a list of the tallest people, verified by the Guinness World Records or other reliable sources.

There are reports about even taller people but most of such claims are unverified or erroneous. Since antiquity, it has been reported about the finds of gigantic human skeletons. Originally thought to belong to mythical giants, these bones were later identified as the exaggerated remains of prehistoric animals, usually whales or elephants. Regular reports of giant human skeletons in American newspapers in 18th and 19th century probably initiated a case with a "petrified" Cardiff Giant, a famous archaeological hoax.

Men

Women

Disputed and unverified claims

Tallest in various sports

Tallest living people from various nations

See also 
 Giant
 Gigantism
 Goliath
 Human height
 Sotos syndrome
 List of tallest players in National Basketball Association history
 List of heaviest people
 List of the verified shortest people
 List of people with dwarfism

References

External links 
 
 
 
 
 
 

Biological records
Human height
Human height
Lists of people by physical attribute
Lists of people-related superlatives
People